A constitutional referendum was held in Switzerland on 12 May 1872. The new constitution was rejected by 50.5% of voters and a majority of cantons.

Background
In order to pass, any amendments to the constitution needed a double majority; a majority of the popular vote and majority of the cantons. The decision of each canton was based on the vote in that canton. Full cantons counted as one vote, whilst half cantons counted as half.

Results

References

1872 referendums
1872 in Switzerland
1872
Constitutional referendums in Switzerland
May 1872 events